The Merkel Cabinet is the name of any of four cabinets in the Federal Republic of Germany led by Angela Merkel:
First Merkel cabinet (2005–2009)
Second Merkel cabinet (2009–2013)
Third Merkel cabinet (2013–2018)
Fourth Merkel cabinet (2018–2021)